Veselin Sarbakov (Bulgarian: Веселин Сърбаков; born 8 August 1975) is a former Bulgarian footballer who is currently U-12 coach at Levski Sofia.

Biography

Sarbakov spent the majority of his career in the top flight of Bulgarian football, most notably representing Levski Sofia almost continuously between the 1993/1994 and 1998/1999 seasons, making 35 league appearances and scoring two goals for the "bluemen". He also played for Litex Lovech, Pirin, Akademik Sofia, Kaliakra, Vihren, and Hebar. Following Sarbakov's retirement, he became coach of Levski Sofia youth teams, obtaining a UEFA "A" license.

References

1975 births
Living people
Association football midfielders
Bulgarian footballers
First Professional Football League (Bulgaria) players
PFC Levski Sofia players
Hapoel Rishon LeZion F.C. players
PFC Litex Lovech players
FC Hebar Pazardzhik players
OFC Pirin Blagoevgrad players
Akademik Sofia players
PFC Kaliakra Kavarna players
OFC Vihren Sandanski players